Dinamo Fima is a Malagasy football club based in Antananarivo, Madagascar. The team has won the THB Champions League in 1982 and 1983. The team currently plays in the Malagasy Second Division.

Achievements
THB Champions League
Champion (2): 1982, 1983
Coupe de Madagascar
Winner (2): 1981, 1983

Performance in CAF competitions
CAF Champions League: 1 appearance
1983 – First round

References

External links
Team profile - foot-base.com
Team profile - The Biggest Football Archive of the World

Football clubs in Madagascar
Antananarivo